The Cabinet of Prince Qing was the first cabinet of the Qing dynasty and of China, formed as part of the Qing state's reforms to create a constitutional monarchy in the early 20th century. It was active from 8 May to 1 November 1911, led by the Prime Minister of the Imperial Cabinet, Yikuang (Prince Qing). It initially consisted of thirteen members, of which nine were Manchus (seven of whom were from the imperial clan) while only four were Han Chinese. As a result, it remained unpopular among the people and was nicknamed the "Princes' Cabinet" or "Imperial Family Cabinet"() by its critics.

History 
The Imperial Cabinet was formed as a result of the constitutional reforms, the New Policies, being enacted in China in the early 20th century. It replaced the Grand Council, although it was unpopular and was described as "the old Grand Council under the name of a cabinet, autocracy under the name of constitutionalism."

Members of the provisional assemblies, which were formed in 1908–09, protested against the formation of this cabinet. On 12 May, the Federation of Provincial Assemblies declared that imperial princes should not serve as premiers and that the Princes' Cabinet is not compatible with a constitutional monarchy. On 5 July, over 40 legislators submitted a petition to form a new cabinet. The imperial court responded with an edict which stated that assemblymen should not interfere with the appointment and dismissal of officials.

The Princes' Cabinet was dissolved in November 1911 when Prince Qing resigned and his ally, general Yuan Shikai, was appointed prime minister in his place, establishing the Yuan Cabinet.

Composition 
The following is the list of cabinet ministers. Unless otherwise noted, their term began on 8 May and ended on 1 November when the cabinet was dismissed.

References

Further reading 
 

Government of the Qing dynasty
Cabinets established in 1911
Cabinets disestablished in 1911